Heighington is a village in the borough of Darlington and ceremonial county of County Durham, England. The population of the civil parish at the 2011 census was 2,395.  It is situated between Darlington and Shildon, near Newton Aycliffe. One of its most significant features is St Michael's Church that sits in the middle of a large village green. The church is Norman, except for the 13th-century south aisle and the 19th-century north aisle. A rare feature in this church is a pre-Reformation oak pulpit with six traceried linen fold panels, with an inscription bearing prayers for its donor: an Alexander Flettcher and his wife Agnes.

Heighington previously boasted a Methodist Chapel, but this has since been converted into housing. The more recent expansion of the village is in the area around Pinewood Crescent and the area around the Beech Crescent, Manor Court and Orchard Gardens, built 1997.
A recent, famous resident from Heighington, is actor, writer and producer Mark Gatiss. It is often (wrongly) claimed that his father worked at nearby Winterton Hospital, and that this became the inspiration for ideas in The League of Gentlemen, but it was in fact Aycliffe Hospital where his father worked. 
The confusion likely arose, from the fact that both (now demolished) hospitals lay in the district of Sedgefield and someone assumed it was Winterton. This mistake then led onto the assumption that Gatiss must therefore have been born in the village of Sedgefield (being next to Winterton Hospital), but in actuality, he was born only in the district of Sedgefield, in the village of Heighington, some miles away.

Heighington is also known for its Spar shop and three pubs, The Bay Horse, The George And Dragon and The Dog Inn, which lies just outside the village.

The village up until recent years was home to a Post Office (which included a shop) next to the village green.  That shop closed down and the Post Office, along with the postbox, has been relocated to the village hall.

Since the turn of the millennium, a field on the outskirts of the village (on the way to Shildon and Bishop Auckland) has been converted into a football field.  This site is currently undergoing development, including the construction of an adventure playground.

In 2006 Heighington was judged, by Ptolemy Dean, from amongst 11 other villages around the UK to be the BBC's Perfect Village.

Heighington CE Primary School is a voluntary controlled Church of England primary school located in Hopelands. It educates around 260 pupils aged 4–11. It has been assessed by Ofsted as providing an outstanding education.

Gallery

References

External links

 
Villages in County Durham
Places in the Borough of Darlington
Places in the Tees Valley
Civil parishes in County Durham